Queen Jeinwondeok (제인원덕왕비, 齊仁元德王妃; 15 December 1476 – 16 May 1537), of the Geochang Sin clan, was the wife and queen consort of Yi Yung, King Yeonsan, the 10th Joseon monarch. She was queen consort of Joseon from 1494 until her husband's deposition in 1506, after which she was known as Deposed Queen Sin (폐비 신씨). She didn't receive posthumous name as a queen after her death.

Biography

Early life 
Lady Sin was born into the Geochang Sin clan on 15 December 1476 to Sin Seung-seon and Princess Jungmo. Her mother is the daughter of King Sejong's fourth son, Grand Prince Imyeong. The grand prince was the younger brother of Prince Gwangpyeong, who served as Yeonguijeong during the reign of King Sejo, and King Sejo are the uncles of Lady Sin. Thus making Lady Shin 7th cousins (a first cousin twice removed) with her future husband. 

As Lady Sin's brothers, including herself, came from a prestigious family, they had overlapping marriages with the royal family. She was the aunt of Queen Dangyeong, the first wife of King Jungjong and was also the aunt of Nam Chi-won, husband of Princess Gyeongsun, the 5th daughter of King Seongjong.

Her older brother, Sin Soo-geun, also married a first cousin of Queen Insu, as well as her third older brother, Sin Soo-yeong, who married Queen Ansun’s younger sister.

Marriage 
In March 1487, the 18th year of King Seongjong, Lady Sin was arranged to marry the Crown Prince, and on 26 January 1488, the 19th year of King Seongjong, the following year, the marriage ceremony was held at Injeong Hall in Changdeok Palace. Lady Sin was then title as the Crown Princess Consort of Joseon.

Lady Sin was given the titles of Princess Consort Yeonsan (연산군부인, 燕山君夫人) and Princess Consort Geochang (거창군부인, 居昌郡夫人).

Life as princess consort 
According to the Annals of the Joseon Dynasty, Sin was peaceful, respectful, gentle and discreet because of her virtues. She touched her subordinates with grace.

In 1491, the 22nd year of King Seongjong, Princess Hwisin was born, and in 1493, the 24th year of King Seongjong, the Princess consort participated in Chinjamrye that was hosted by Queen Jeonghyeon.

In 1494, the 25th year of King Seongjong, the Princess consort gave birth to a son, but died a month later. In December of the same year, King Seongjong passed away and Yeonsangun took the throne. Her royal title changed from Princess Consort to Queen Consort.

Life as queen consort 
In 1497, 3rd year of Yeonsangun’s reign, under the supervision of the queen, about 160 citizens were invited to perform at the Seonjeon Hall in Changdeok Palace. In December of the same year, she gave birth to Crown Prince Hwang. In 1498, 1500, and 1503, Queen Sin also gave special treatment to the elderly by offering a funeral for the elderly.

In 1499, the Queen’s 13-year-old niece, Lady Sin, married Grand Prince Jinseong, who was the son of King Seongjong and Queen Jeonghyeon, and became Princess Consort (later Queen Dangyeong).

In 1502, the 8th year of Yeonsangun’s reign, the Queen’s father, Sin Seung-seon passed away. At this time, the Queen was in full term and was about to give birth, but King Yeonsangun prevented his wife from seeing her father as he wanted the her birth to auspicious.

In 1504, the 10th year of Yeonsangun’s reign, King Yeonsangun caused a purge in connection with the death of his mother, Queen Jeheon, and executed the ministers and members of the royal family that were involved. It was said that the King went to his step-mother’s, Queen Dowager Jasun, quarters and held her at sword point. To which he ordered the Queen Dowager to come out of her living quarters, but the Queen consort intervened to protect her mother-in-law from her step-son.

A few days after the ordeal, the king organized another Chinjamrye. Geochang-gun, the hometown of the Queen, was promoted to a county during the reign of King Yeonsangun, and then was relegated to Geochang-hyeon.

In 1505, she was honoured with the title Queen Jeinwondeok. After the Jungjong coup in 1506, King Yeonsan demoted to prince and sent into exile on Ganghwado, where he died the same year after only a few weeks. Queen Jeinwondeok lost her status as queen consort and was known simply as a princess consort and her sons were sentenced to death by poisoning right after the coup, despite that the new king, Jungjong, was reluctant.

Later life 
After she was deposed, Jungjong treated her generously. Her slaves in from her family did not leave her because of her good character.

In 1506, Prince Yeonsan died after being in exile having said “I miss my wife, Lady Shin” (아내 신씨가 보고 싶다). In the Annals of the Joseon Dynasty, it is said that Yeonsan cared for Lady Shin, or that he took care of her and her relatives. There are records that there were many children between the two of them. On the day of his sudden death, Lady Shin was the only person who stopped Yeonsangun from running amok, and Yeonsangun turned around without harming her.

In 1512, the 7th year of King Jungjong’s reign, Deposed Queen Sin suggested that the tomb of her husband, Yeonsangun, be moved to Haechon, Yangju, and King Jungjong allowed it.

In 1521, when the house of her family collapsed to due to the rain, King Jungjong gave away the house of Ahn Cheo-gyeom (안처겸, 安處謙).

The deposed Queen outlived her husband by 31 years and died at the age of 60 on 16 May 1537. She is interred beside Yeonsan's tomb and her tombstone stated her name as Princess Consort Geochang of the Geochang Sin clan (거창군부인 신씨).

Princess Hwisin’s son, Gu Eom, held the ancestral rites for Queen Sin and King Yeonsangun. And after Gu died, his adoptive grandson, Yi Ahn-nul (이안눌, 李安訥) inherited the position.

Family
Parent

 Father − Sin Seung-seon (1436 – 1502) (신승선, 愼承善)
 1) Grandfather − Sin Jeon (신전, 愼詮)
 2) Great-Grandfather − Sin Yi-chong (신이충, 愼以衷)
 1) Grandmother − Lady Ahn of the Sunheung Ahn clan (증 정경부인 순흥 안씨, 贈 貞敬夫人 順興 安氏); daughter of Ahn Kang (안강, 安剛)
 Mother − Princess Jungmo, Internal Princess Consort Heungan of the Jeonju Yi clan (정경부인 중모현주 증 흥안부부인 전주 이씨, 貞敬夫人 中牟縣主 贈 興安府夫人 全州 李氏) (1435 - ?)
 1) Grandfather − Yi Gu, Grand Prince Imyeong (6 January 1420 – 21 January 1469) (이구 임영대군)
 1) Grandmother − Grand Princess Consort Jean of the Jeonju Choi clan (제안부부인 전주 최씨)
 2) Aunt - Princess Cheongha (1447 - ?)
 2) Uncle - Ahn Woo-geon (안우건)
 3) Adoptive cousin - Ahn Hwan (안환, 安煥) (1469 - ?)

Sibling

 Older brother − Sin Su-geun (신수근, 愼守勤) (1450 - 1506)
 Sister-in-law - Internal Princess Consort Yeongga of the Andong Gwon clan (영가부부인 안동 권씨)
Sister-in-law - Han Eun-gwang, Internal Princess Consort Cheongwon of the Cheongju Han clan (한은광 정경부인 청원부부인 청주 한씨, 韓銀光 貞敬夫人 贈 淸原府夫人 淸州 韓氏) (1447 - ?)
 Nephew − Sin Hong-bo (신홍보)
 Nephew − Sin Hong-pil (신홍필) (1487 - ?)
 Niece − Queen Dangyeong (단경왕후, 端敬王后) (7 February 1487 - 27 December 1557)
 Nephew − Sin Hong-jo (신홍조, 愼弘祚) (1490 - ?)
 Niece-in-law - Lady Im of the Pungcheon Im clan (풍천 임씨)
 Grandnephew - Sin Sa-heon (신사헌, 愼思獻) or Sin Chong-heon (신충헌, 愼忠獻) (1520 - ?)
 Nephew − Sin Hong-woo (신홍우)
 Older brother − Sin Su-gyeom (신수겸, 愼守謙) (1453 - 1506)
 Sister-in-law - Lady Kang of the Jinsan Kang clan (정부인 진산 강씨, 貞夫人 晋山 姜氏) (1452 - ?); daughter of Kang Ja-pyeong (강자평)
 Niece - Lady Sin of the Geochang Sin clan (거창 신씨, 居昌 慎氏)
 Nephew-in-law - Gu Hui-gyeong (구희경, 具希璟)
 Sister-in-law - Lady Jeon of the Damyang Jeon clan (정부인 담양 전씨, 貞夫人 潭陽 田氏)
 Older brother − Sin Su-yeong (신수영, 愼守英) (1461 - 2 September 1506)
 Sister-in-law - Lady Han of the Cheongju Han clan (정부인 청주 한씨, 貞夫人 淸州 韓氏) (1459 -?); Queen Ansun's younger sister
 Nephew - Sin Hong-je (신홍제, 愼弘濟)
 Nephew - Sin Hong-yu (신홍유, 愼弘猷)
 Older sister - Lady Sin of the Geochang Sin clan (거창 신씨, 居昌 慎氏) (1466 - ?)
 Brother-in-law - Yi Hyeong (이형, 李泂) of the Jeonju Yi clan (1479 - ?)
 Older sister - Lady Sin of the Geochang Sin clan (거창 신씨, 居昌 慎氏) (1467 - ?)
 Brother-in-law - Nam Gyeong (남경, 南憬) (1467 - ?) 
 Nephew - Nam Chi-won (남치원, 南致元) (1482 - ?)
 Niece-in-law - Yi Ok-hwan, Princess Gyeongsun (이옥환, 李玉環; 경순옹주) (1482 - ?)
 Grandnephew - Nam Gi (남기, 南沂) (1502 - 1546)
 Grandniece - Lady Nam of the Uiryeong Nam clan (의령 남씨, 宜寧 南氏) 
 Older sister - Lady Sin of the Geochang Sin clan (거창 신씨, 居昌 慎氏) (1469 - ?)
 Brother-in-law - Ahn Hwan (안환, 安煥) (1469 - ?)

Consort

 Yi Yung, King Yeonsan (23 November 1476 – 20 November 1506) (조선 연산군)
 Mother-in-law - Queen Jeheon of the Haman Yun clan (15 July 1455 - 29 August 1482) (제헌왕후 윤씨)
 Legal mother-in-law - Queen Jeonghyeon of the Papyeong Yun clan (21 July 1462 – 13 September 1530) (정현왕후 윤씨)
 Father-in-law - Yi Hyeol, King Seongjong of Joseon (20 August 1457 - 20 January 1494) (조선 성종왕)

Issue

 Daughter - Princess Hwisin (24 October 1491 – ?) (휘신공주)
 Son-in-law - Gu Mun-gyeong (구문경, 具文璟) of the Neungseong Gu clan (능성 구씨, 綾城 具氏); Gu Su-yeong's son (구수영, 具壽永) (1456 - 1523)
 Grandson − Gu Eom (구엄, 具渰) (1512 - ?)
 Unnamed daughter
 Unnamed son (1494 – 1494)
 Deposed Crown Prince Yi Hwang (10 January 1498 – 24 September 1506) (폐왕세자 이황)
 Unnamed son (1500 – ?)
 Yi Seong, Grand Prince Changnyeong (18 June 1500 – 10 October 1506) (이성 창녕대군)
 Grand Prince Yi In-soo (대군 이인수, 李仁壽) (1501 - 12 September 1503)
 Grand Prince Yi Chong-soo (대군 이총수, 李聰壽) (1502 - 1503)
 Grand Prince Yi Yeong-soo (대군 이영수, 李榮壽) (1503 - 1503)

In popular culture
 Portrayed by Gwon Jae-hee in the 1988 film Diary of King Yeonsan.
 Portrayed by Park Ha-sun in the 2007-2008 SBS TV series The King and I.
Portrayed by Hong Soo-hee in the 2011-2012 JTBC TV series Insu, The Queen Mother.
Portrayed by Song Ji-in in the 2017 KBS2 TV series Queen for Seven Days.

References

14th-century Korean people
15th-century Korean people
16th-century Korean people
1476 births
1537 deaths
Royal consorts of the Joseon dynasty
Korean queens consort
Geochang Shin clan
15th-century Korean women